Jazil (February 11, 2003 – October 11, 2014) was an American Thoroughbred racehorse.

In 2006, Jazil dead-heated for fourth place in the Kentucky Derby but then won the Belmont Stakes, the final leg of the Triple Crown.

Connections 
Jazil was owned by the Shadwell Stable. He was trained by Kiaran McLaughlin and ridden by Fernando Jara. He was bred in Kentucky by Skara Glen Stables.

Breeding 
The late thoroughbred's sire is Seeking The Gold, who also sired Dubai Millennium, while his dam is Better Than Honour by Deputy Minister.  His grandsire was Mr. Prospector and in his breeding line are such horses as Raise a Native and Northern Dancer.

Siblings: 
Teeming - 2001 bay filly by Storm Cat 
Magnificent Honour - 2002 bay filly by A.P. Indy 
Rags to Riches - 2004 chestnut filly by A.P. Indy 
Casino Drive - 2005 chesnut colt by A.P. Indy 
Man of Iron - 2006 colt by Giant's Causeway

In September 2007, Jazil was retired to stud at Shadwell Farm's Lexington, Kentucky division.  His fee was set at $12,500 for a live foal in 2008 but was reduced to $4,000 by the time of his death. He sired Jazz on Ice (2008), owned by Thurman Thomas and J. Scott Whittle, and On The Roof Top (2008) owned by David Dukkaos and Thaig Poorgksi. Jazil died on October 11, 2014 from injuries secondary to an accident in his outdoor paddock.

Racing career

References 

 NTRA bio
 Jazil's pedigree and racing stats

2003 racehorse births
2014 racehorse deaths
Belmont Stakes winners
Racehorses bred in Kentucky
Racehorses trained in the United States
Thoroughbred family 8-f